The 2022 Milano–Torino was the 103rd edition of the Milano–Torino cycling classic. It was held on 16 March 2022 as a category 1.Pro race on the 2022 UCI ProSeries calendar. The race, which is usually held in the autumn, was held in March for the first time since 2005.

The race began in Magenta, on the outskirts of Milan, and finished in Rivoli, on the outskirts of Turin.

Teams 
Fourteen of the 18 UCI WorldTeams and six UCI ProTeams made up the 20 teams that participated in the race. In total, there were 134 riders entered into the race, though only 131 started; of those riders, 129 finished.

UCI WorldTeams

 
 
 
 
 
 
 
 
 
 
 
 
 
 

UCI ProTeams

Result

References

External links 
  

2022
Milano–Torino
Milano–Torino
Milano–Torino